OSI may refer to:

Places
 Osijek Airport (IATA code: OSI), an airport in Croatia
 Ősi, a village in Veszprém county, Hungary
 Oši, an archaeological site in Semigallia, Latvia
 Osi, a village in Ido-Osi, Ekiti State, Nigeria
 Osi, Ekiti LGA.Kwara State, Nigeria

Organizations
 Oblates of St. Joseph, a Roman Catholic Religious order that uses the postnominal initials O.S.I.
 Open Source Initiative, an organization dedicated to promoting open source software
 Open Society Institute, a private charitable foundation established by George Soros to promote open societies around the world
 Open Society Institute-Baltimore, a locally based foundation that is part of Open Society Foundations
 Open Space Institute, an organization that seeks to preserve scenic, natural and historic landscapes
 Ordnance Survey Ireland (Suirbhéireacht Ordanáis Éireann)
 Otto-Suhr-Institut, the political-science institute of the Free University of Berlin

Companies
 OSI Group, an American holding company of meat processors that service the retail and food service industries
 OSI Pharmaceuticals, an American pharmaceutical company
 OSI Restaurant Partners, the restaurant and entertainment group that includes Outback Steakhouse
 OSI Systems, a company that manufactures security scanners and medical equipment based in California
 OSIsoft, a privately held company that develops device connectivity software
 Objective Systems Integrators, a company that provides monitoring software for communication networks
 Open Systems International, an automation software vendor for the electric, petroleum, transportation and water industries
 Officine Stampaggi Industriali, a defunct Italian coachbuilder
 Ohio Scientific Inc. (also known as Ohio Scientific Instruments), a US microcomputer manufacturer 1975-1981
 Officine Stampaggi Industriali, Italian coachbuilder

Government
 Office of Scientific Intelligence, former name of a department of the Central Intelligence Agency now called the Directorate of Science and Technology
 Office of Strategic Influence, a former American government agency, part of the Department of Defense and focused on psychological warfare
 Office of Special Investigations (disambiguation), a name shared by several government agencies
 U.S. Air Force Office of Special Investigations
 Office of Special Investigations (Government Accountability Office)
 Office of Special Investigations (United States Department of Justice)
 Office of Scientific Integrity, now United States Office of Research Integrity
 Office of Special Investigation, a secret intelligence unit of Republic of Korea Air Force

Technology
 Open Systems Interconnection, (ISO 7498) a joint ISO and ITU-T standard for computer networks and communication protocols
 OSI model, a layered description for communications and computer network protocol design
 OSI protocols
 Open switching interval, a type of disconnect supervision in telecommunication
 On-Site Inspection, an advanced measure technique combining several methods, especially used in order to detect nuclear tests

Arts and entertainment
 OSI (band), an American progressive rock supergroup named after the former Office of Strategic Influence government agency
 Office of Strategic Influence (album), the 2003 debut album by the band OSI
 Origin Systems, a former United States computer game developer
 Orchestra della Svizzera Italiana, an orchestra in southern Switzerland in the city of Lugano which is in the canton of Ticino

Fiction
 Office of Scientific Intelligence a fictional United States government agency in several television programs and movies;
 Office of Secret Intelligence, a fictional United States government secret agency in the animated series The Venture Bros.

People
 Osi (ancient tribe), an ancient tribe in Europe
 Alans (ancient term Osi), an ancient tribe in the Caucasus
 Osi Umenyiora (born 1981), former American football player
 Osi Rhys Osmond (1942–2015), Welsh painter

Other uses
 Official sector involvement, in sovereign debt restructuring deals, as opposed to private sector involvement
 Options Symbology Initiative, a plan to change the way that exchange-traded options are named in option symbol
 Out-of-Station Interchange, a pedestrian change between two London Underground stations that allows continuity as part of one chargeable journey

See also
 Osis (disambiguation)